Roger O'Donnell (born 29 October 1955) is an English keyboardist best known for his work with The Cure. O'Donnell has also performed in The Psychedelic Furs, Thompson Twins and Berlin, as well as having an active solo career.

Background 
O'Donnell was born in East London into a musical family, next to the piano in his parents' London home. O'Donnell attended art school but left to pursue a career as a professional musician, with his first paying gig coming in 1976, at Oxford Town Hall backing legendary British pop icon Arthur Brown.

O'Donnell joined the Thompson Twins as a live keyboardist in July 1983, playing alongside future Cure bandmate and drummer Boris Williams. Both completed the Side Kicks Tour in 1983 and also played with the band on the Into the Gap/Out of the Gap tours in 1984. In the early 1980s, while with the Thompson Twins, Berlin, and the Psychedelic Furs, O'Donnell was a big fan of synthesisers produced by Sequential Circuits, which produced such classics as the Prophet 5, Prophet T8, and Prophet VS. While on tour with the Psychedelic Furs, O'Donnell set the record for having the most Sequential models onstage at one time.

Career

The Cure
O'Donnell first joined The Cure in 1987, after being longtime friends with drummer Boris Williams. He played with The Cure during their Kiss Me Kiss Me Kiss Me tour, though he did not contribute to the album. (He does however appear in the music videos for "Just Like Heaven" and "Hot Hot Hot!!!" and appeared in tour promo art.) With O'Donnell on keyboards, Porl Thompson was able to focus on guitar full-time, instead of assisting Tolhurst on keyboards for many of the songs. Some of O'Donnell's performances from this tour can be heard on the deluxe edition of Kiss Me, Kiss Me, Kiss Me.

For the next album Disintegration, O'Donnell became a fully integrated member of the band, and his songwriting contributions can be heard on the songs "Out of Mind" and "Fear of Ghosts," which are the B-Sides to the hit singles "Lullaby" and "Lovesong", respectively. He is also featured on the live album from this period, Entreat. Following The Cure's Prayer Tour in 1989, O'Donnell left the band in 1990.

During the period of the Cure's greatest success, O'Donnell was the band's only member to play piano and keyboards as his primary instrument. Previous keyboardist Lol Tolhurst also played drums for a time and subsequent keyboardist Perry Bamonte later switched to guitar. O'Donnell rejoined The Cure in late 1994 and appeared on the albums Wild Mood Swings, Bloodflowers, and The Cure. He also appears on the live DVD The Cure: Trilogy. During this period it is notable that O'Donnell introduced the band to digital recording.

When O'Donnell started working on his solo album The Truth in Me in early 2005, he stated that he had no plans to leave The Cure. However, later in that year Robert Smith decided to reconfigure The Cure as a trio, without O'Donnell or Perry Bamonte. O'Donnell would later confirm that the rumour of him being fired by E-mail was false, and if The Cure hadn't been reduced to a trio he would have left regardless to concentrate on solo material.

In May 2011, O'Donnell and Laurence Tolhurst reunited with The Cure to perform the band's first three albums – Three Imaginary Boys, Seventeen Seconds, and Faith – in their entirety at the Sydney Opera House in Australia. The set also included a number of B-sides and singles played during the encore. On 11 September O'Donnell announced on his Facebook page that he had rejoined The Cure.

Solo work
O'Donnell's current solo career commenced when he was asked to submit a song for a documentary being made about Bob Moog, Moog. This was in early 2004 whilst he was still a member of The Cure. Later that year whilst helping to promote the film with its producer Ryan Page at the Sheffield Documentary Festival, conversation led to the suggestion that O'Donnell should write an entire album of music composed and recorded in the same way as the song "Another Year Away". The song was composed entirely and performed solely on a Minimoog Voyager.

Later that year and into early 2005 when work with The Cure had ended O'Donnell completed the project which was to become "The Truth in Me" the album released in 2006.

In summer 2005, O'Donnell and his longtime partner and collaborator Erin Lang formed their own label with the idea of supporting and encouraging otherwise unsignable artists, mainly in the electronic genre, and releasing their own music. The first release was in September 2005, a sampler "Nothing Concrete" featuring songs from 10 unsigned artists. The label is called 99 Times Out of 10 or 99X/10.

In discussions to find a distributor in the US Roger was offered a record deal with independent label group Worlds Fair on their new Warner Brothers distributed label Great Society.

O'Donnell released two albums with Great Society, "The Truth in Me" in 2006 and "Songs From The Silver Box" in 2009. Both featuring Erin Lang on vocals with a special guest appearance from Australian singer Lenka on the latter. An EP of remixes was also released from "The Truth in Me" featuring versions by Dntel, Fourtet and Console all very highly regarded artists in the electronic field.

Roger's association with World's Fair and Great Society came to an end in 2009 when the label folded. All of his and Erin Lang's future releases will be handled by 99X/10.

Future projects nearing completion as of Spring 2010 are a collection of songs for piano, cello and voice entitled Two/Three – Before. The trio features O'Donnell on piano, Erin Lang, vocals and longtime friend Paul van Dongen on cello. A preview concert performance in Toronto in February 2010 with the Corktown Chamber Orchestra led to another project which O'Donnell has composed for the orchestra, Quieter Trees.

Quieter Trees is a group of six songs inspired by a painting by British artist David Hockney "Bigger Trees Near Warter". It was performed in London Morley College by the Centre for Young Musicians on 2 July 2011 and it will be performed in November in Toronto this time with O'Donnell playing piano.

After having been introduced to Adam Donen in late 2011 the two decided to collaborate on a work for a small ensemble of violin, viola,  two celli, French horn, woodwinds and two female voices. Entitled Requiem, it celebrated the life of Richard Dawkins. Performed once only at St Leonards Church in Shoreditch East London. The pair went on to work on a suite for Chamber orchestra entitled Bernhard inspired by the literary works of Thomas Bernhard. It was performed by the Württemberg Chamber Orchestra in Germany and again in London at the Cadogan Halls in Chelsea.

In June 2015, O'Donnell released a solo album 'Love and Other Tragedies' featuring Julia Kent of Anthony and the Johnsons on cello.

O’Donnell also guest starred in the Australian Comedy Show “These New South Whales” based on the Australian Punk Band of that name.

Musical works

Albums and compositions 
Grey Clouds, Red Sky, instrumental album recorded in 1994, remastered and released in 2005; each copy was autographed)
The Truth in Me (2006)
Songs from the Silver Box (2009)
Piano Formations (2010)
Quieter Trees (July 2011)
Requiem, composed by Adam Donen and Roger O'Donnell, performed by the Contrarian Ensemble (2012)
Love and Other Tragedies (2015)
 The Bernhard Suite, composed by Adam Donen and Roger O'Donnell, performed by the Württemberg Chamber Orchestra Heilbronn (2013)
2 Ravens (2020)

EPs 

 Charlie Crow – Trains on Bridges (2009)

Songs and themes 

 "Another Year Away", song to the film score for the documentary Moog (2004), created exclusively with the Minimoog Voyager).
 "Another Name" from Nothing Concrete – 99X/10 Label Sampler (2006)

Unreleased soundtracks 

Soundtrack for the short film Not Ever, directed by Ben Mourra and starring Emilia Fox (2013)

Remixes 

 Half Truths, iTunes's only download of six remixes from The Truth in Me (2006)

Credits 
O'Donnell is credited as the keyboardist on the following recordings:
 Polystar
 Parade
 Maus
 Tuuli
 Frausdots
 Goddamn Electric Bill "Swallowed by the Machines"
 Amycanbe "Heal "V3 Dino" Mix" (remix)

Music video 
O'Donnell appeared in only one official Thompson Twins music video, but it was made quite some time after he had left the group in the summer of 1986. Thompson Twins became a duo (following the departure of Joe Leeway) and had recorded a song for the film Nothing in Common starring Tom Hanks and featuring the last performance by Jackie Gleason. The video for the song of the same name as the movie was shot on location in Chicago, with Hanks making a cameo appearance playing drums. O'Donnell appeared playing the keyboards.

References

External links 
 

1955 births
Living people
The Cure members
English rock keyboardists
English rock pianists
English electronic musicians
English new wave musicians
Ableton Live users
Musicians from London